Michel-Maurice-Augustin-Marie Darmancier (born in 1918 in Izieux) was a French clergyman and bishop for the Roman Catholic Diocese of Wallis et Futuna. He was appointed bishop in 1961. He died in 1984.

References 

1918 births
1984 deaths
French Roman Catholic bishops
Roman Catholic bishops of Wallis et Futuna